J. H. Johnson was a state legislator in Mississippi. He represented DeSoto County, Mississippi in the Mississippi House of Representatives 1872–1875.

He was an abolitionist from Ohio who assisted people in their escape from slavery. He served as a trustee of a normal school in Holly Springs, Mississippi.

He studied at Oberlin College. He attended a colored convention in 1872. He was described as short, very stout, and as having one-half Anglo-Saxon blood. He proposed a bill to establish a female normal school in Hillsboro, Mississippi. He was a Republican.

See also
 African-American officeholders during and following the Reconstruction era

References

African-American state legislators in Mississippi
Republican Party members of the Mississippi House of Representatives
African-American politicians during the Reconstruction Era
People from DeSoto County, Mississippi
American abolitionists
Activists from Ohio
Oberlin College alumni
Philanthropists from Mississippi